The University of British Columbia Press (UBC Press) is a university press that is part of the University of British Columbia. It was established in 1971. The press is based in Vancouver, British Columbia, Canada, and has editorial offices in Kelowna, British Columbia, and Toronto, Ontario. UBC Press is primarily a social sciences publisher. It publishes books of original scholarship that draws on and reflects current research. Each year UBC Press publishes seventy new titles in a number of fields, including Aboriginal studies, Asian studies, Canadian history, environmental studies, gender and women's studies, health and food studies, geography, law, media and communications, military and security studies, planning and urban studies, and political science.

The press is a member of the Canadian Association of University Presses (CAUP), the Association of University Presses (AUP), the Association of Canadian University Presses (ACUP), the Association of Canadian Publishers (ACP), the International Association of Scholarly Publishers (IASP), and the Association of Book Publishers of British Columbia.

References

External links
University of British Columbia Press

Press
British Columbia, University of
Publishing companies established in 1971